MAXtv is a Croatian pay TV provider owned by Hrvatski Telekom. MAXtv offers both IPTV and DTH paytv. The service was introduced in 2006. The service provides thematic channels, HD channels, video on demand, video recording, the use of an Electronic Program Guide (EPG), MAXtv on two TV sets, MAXtv to GO and other services.

MAXtv Sat channel line-up 
The program packages offered currently (as March 2018) offers 54 TV channels.

20 - RTL Living
21 - HRT 1
22 - HRT 2
23 - RTL
24 - Nova TV
25 - RTL 2
26 - Doma TV
27 - HRT 3
28 - HRT 4
29 - Pickbox TV
30 - N1
31 - SPTV
100 - National Geographic Channel
101 - Nat Geo Wild
103 - History Channel
104 - Crime & Investigation
111 - CBS Reality
112 - Viasat History
113 - Viasat Explore
114 - Viasat Nature
115 - History 2
210 - RTL Kockica
305 - HBO HD
306 - HBO2 HD
307 - HBO3 HD
308 - Cinemax HD
309 - Cinemax 2 HD
310 - AXN
311 - TV 1000
314 - Klasik TV
316 - CineStar TV Action&Thriller
317 - RTL Passion
318 - RTL Crime
319 - CineStar TV Premiere 1
321 - CineStar TV Fantasy
322 - Viasat Epic
323 - KinoTV
400 - SK Start
404 - Arena Sport 1 HD
405 - Arena Sport 2 HD
407 - HNTV
410 - Arena Sport 3 HD
411 - Arena Sport 4 HD
412 - Arena Sport 5 HD
413 - Arena Sport 6 HD
414 - SK1 HD
415 - SK2 HD
416 - SK3 HD
422 - Lov i ribolov
423 - SK Golf
426 - Extreme Sports Channel
500 - 24Kitchen
501 - E!
600 - CMC
602 - MTV Dance
603 - MTV Hits
604 - Djazz.TV
605 - VH1 Europe
606 - VH1 Classic
610 - Jugoton
701 - CNN International
900 - BlueHustler
902 - Dorcel TV
904 - Brazzers TV
905 - Hustler TV
906 - Private

External links 
 
 MAXtv via the Internet

Pay television
Television networks in Croatia